Oakalla is an unincorporated community in Burnet County, Texas, United States. According to the Handbook of Texas, the community had an estimated population of 45 in 2000.

History
The area in what is known as Oakalla today was first settled in the 1850s. A post office was established at Oakalla on May 19, 1879, and remained in operation until sometime after 1930. Two years later, the community had a cotton gin, a drugstore, a blacksmith shop, a general store, and a doctor. In 1890, it further grew to eight more businesses, as well as Baptist and Methodist churches, a gristmill, and 100 residents. There were 14 businesses in 1896 and the population grew to 175. Oakalla Baptist Church was erected in 1908. Land for a Methodist church was deeded by C.W. and Mary Tedder in March of 1923. It was built two years later. Both churches continued to operate in 1990. The population of Oakalla went up to 180 in 1925 and then to 250 in 1931. It had 10 businesses during that time. The population plunged to 100 between 1940 and 1970, then further declined to 45 in the late 1980s. It remained at that level through 2000. In 1990, Oakalla had a general store.

Geography

Education
Oakalla had private schools until a cooperative was built with classrooms on its second floor. It also held church services, especially for the Methodist congregation. The original wooden school structure was razed in 1920 and another building, this time made of stone from the old rock school on Gregory Branch, was built with two classrooms. Two more classrooms were added in 1929. High school students were transferred to the school in Briggs in 1946, and a decade later, the elementary students followed suit. It joined the Lampasas Independent School District in 1958. The old school building then became a community center and a county library branch. It continues to be served by Lampasas ISD today, with elementary kids attending Hanna Springs Elementary in Lampasas.

References

Unincorporated communities in Burnet County, Texas
Unincorporated communities in Texas